Rubus durus is a Cuban species of brambles in the rose family.

Rubus durus is a reclining perennial with curved prickles. Leaves are compound with 3 leaflets. Flowers are white. Fruits are black.

References

durus
Endemic flora of Cuba
Plants described in 1869